Nanarwara (Nanarwada) is a village in Sirohi district in Rajasthan state in India. It is located in the Base of Aravalli Hills , about 50 km south of Sirohi, 25 km north of Abu Road, and also 45 km North from Mount Abu (Hill Station). Swaroopganj is the nearest railway station. Nanarwara is famous for its literacy rates and majority of Rajpurohit community (with Bhaba appellation).

Nanarwara (Nanarwada) is also known as Nanarwara-Purohitan because of majority of Rajpurohit (Bhaba Sepau ) community. In Nanarwara, Approx 250 houses of Rajpurohits out of 400 houses.

References 

Villages in Sirohi district